About To Crack is the fifth studio album by Dutch punk hardcore band Vitamin X. Released through Tankcrimes on September 11, 2012 in the US, Agipunk in Europe and Peculio Discos in Brazil. The album was recorded at Electrical Audio in Chicago by Steve Albini.

An animation video of the song 'About To Crack' was released in 2016 based on John Baizleys artwork and created by Marco IMOV from IMOV Studios. The video features (animated) cameos from people across the punk and metal scenes (Lemmy, Danzig, Municipal Waste, Ozzy, etc.). The cartoon style owes a debt to Beavis & Butthead while paying homage to The Simpsons. The video went viral, reached millions of views  on youtube and was selected for the 2016 Annecy International Animation Festival

Track listing

Personnel

 Marko Korac - vocals
 Marc Emmerik - guitars, backing vocals
 Alex Koutsman - bass, backing vocals
 Wolfram "Wolfi" Eggebrecht - drums
 Steve Albini - recording, engineering, mixing
 Dan Randall - mastering
 Benjamin Flint - assistant engineer
 Patrick Delabie - additional dubs
 John Dyer Baizley - art
 Gijs Edge, Marc, Marko - layout

References

2012 albums
Albums produced by Steve Albini
Albums with cover art by John Dyer Baizley
Vitamin X albums